The Federal Courthouse and Post Office in Mankato, Minnesota, United States, was built in 1896 and expanded in 1932 and 1965.  It is designed in Romanesque or Richardsonian Romanesque style, originally with a tower, by Supervising Architect William Martin Aiken.  Also known as Federal Post Office and Courthouse, it served historically as a courthouse and as a post office.  It was listed on the National Register of Historic Places in 1980.

The 1932 expansion, designed by the Office of the Supervising Architect under James A. Wetmore, more than doubled the size of the building;  the 1965 expansion to the rear, credited to Edward W. Novak, was less dramatic.  Both expansions were compatible in style and materials.

References

Buildings and structures in Blue Earth County, Minnesota
Courthouses on the National Register of Historic Places in Minnesota
Government buildings completed in 1896
Mankato, Minnesota
National Register of Historic Places in Blue Earth County, Minnesota
Post office buildings on the National Register of Historic Places in Minnesota
Richardsonian Romanesque architecture in Minnesota
1896 establishments in Minnesota